Danil Ivanovich Benedyk (born 5 March 2001) is a Russian football player.

Club career
He made his debut in the Russian Football National League for FC Krasnodar-2 on 4 October 2020 in a game against FC Nizhny Novgorod.

References

External links
 Profile by Russian Football National League
 

2001 births
Living people
Russian footballers
Russia youth international footballers
Association football midfielders
PFC Spartak Nalchik players
Russian First League players
Russian Second League players
FC Krasnodar-2 players